The black-headed siskin (Spinus notatus), also known as the Jonny Bee, is a species of finch in the family Fringillidae. It is found in Mexico, Belize, El Salvador, Guatemala, Honduras, and Nicaragua. Its natural habitats are subtropical or tropical moist montane forest and heavily degraded former forest.

Evolution and systematics
This species is part of a rapid recent adaptive radiation of Spinus finches in Central and South America, which produced at least eight other recognized species: S. atratus, S. crassirostris, S. spinescens, S. yarrellii, S. magellanicus, S. olivaceus, S. xanthogastrus, and S. barbatus.  The black-headed siskin was the earliest of these species to diverge.  

It was originally proposed that the radiation occurred around 3.5 million years ago, when an ancestral form, perhaps similar to the modern-day black-headed siskin, was able to adaptively radiate into South America.  In this version of events, the dispersal into South America happened before the isthmus of Panama was complete (around 2.7 million years ago), but when mesothermal montane plant species were able to disperse across the narrowing strait.  The novel plant communities in South America would have created many new niches into which the ancestral species adaptively radiated.

More recent work suggests the species radiation happened much later, within the last 1 million years, and posits the radiation happened due to climate change in the late Pleistocene.  The changing climate could have fragmented various habitats in the Andes, initiating allopatric speciation.

References

Further reading

black-headed siskin
Birds of Central America
black-headed siskin
black-headed siskin
Taxonomy articles created by Polbot